Legionella wadsworthii is a bacterium from the genus Legionella isolated from sputum from a patient in Los Angeles. It can cause pneumonia in humans.

References

External links
Type strain of Legionella wadsworthii at BacDive -  the Bacterial Diversity Metadatabase

Legionellales
Bacteria described in 1983